Ćaić is a village in the city of Livno in Canton 10, the Federation of Bosnia and Herzegovina, Bosnia and Herzegovina.

Demographics 

According to the 2013 census, its population was 315, all Croats.

Footnotes

Bibliography 

 

Populated places in Livno